The 1952 Arkansas gubernatorial election was held on November 4, 1952.

Incumbent Democratic Governor Sid McMath was defeated in the Democratic primary.

Democratic nominee Francis Cherry defeated Republican nominee Jefferson W. Speck with 87.41% of the vote.

Primary elections
Primary elections were held on July 29, 1952, with the Democratic runoff held on August 12, 1952.

Democratic primary

Candidates
Francis Cherry, Chancery Judge
Jack Holt, Former Attorney General and unsuccessful candidate for Democratic nomination for Governor in 1948
Sid McMath, incumbent Governor
Ike Murry, incumbent Arkansas Attorney General
Boyd Anderson Tackett, U.S. Representative for the 4th district

Results

General election

Candidates
Francis Cherry, Democratic
Jefferson W. Speck, Republican, farmer, and candidate for Governor in 1950

Results

References

Bibliography
 

1952
Arkansas
Gubernatorial
November 1952 events in the United States